Steven Lima is an American politician. He served as a Democratic member for the 49th district of the Rhode Island House of Representatives.

In 2021, Lima won the election for the 42nd district of the Rhode Island House of Representatives. He succeeded Michael Morin. Lima assumed his office on January 5, 2021. He lived in Woonsocket, Rhode Island. Lima decided not to seek re-election in 2022.

References 

Living people
Place of birth missing (living people)
Year of birth missing (living people)
Democratic Party members of the Rhode Island House of Representatives
21st-century American politicians